"Runnin' is a 2013 single from New Zealand rapper David Dallas, taken from his third studio album Falling Into Place.  It was released on 27 August 2013 and peaked at #7 in the New Zealand singles chart  and was certified Platinum by Recorded Music NZ. "Runnin features on the soundtrack of video game FIFA 14, and also the critically acclaimed film Hustle.

Composition
"Runnin is a blues-influenced hip hop song.

Music video 
A music video for the song was released on 22 September 2013. It was directed by Tom Gould and filmed in and around Mitimiti, a small settlement in the Hokianga. Much of the video was shot in the nearby historic St Gabriel's church in Pawarenga. The video also features wild horses of the region.

Charts and certifications

Charts

Certifications

References

External links 

 Music video at YouTube

2013 singles
David Dallas songs
2013 songs